Nimisha Mehta  is a British actress, model and dancer, of Indian descent, working in the Hindi film industry. She made her Hindi film debut in'
Days of Tafree(remake of Gujarati super hit film Chhello Divas) in 2016. She is also known for her work as Aisha in A.I.SHA My Virtual Girlfriend.

Early life and background
Mehta was born on 6 January 1990 in Ahmedabad, Gujarat to parents Viren and Nilma. They all moved to London, UK when she was 2 years old. She has an older sister named Krupali Shah. Nimisha did her schooling in London and graduated in BA Hons LLB Law from University of Westminster with an upper second class degree. Alongside her studies, she kept herself busy with modelling and acting in London. She was crowned Miss India London 2013, part of the Miss India Worldwide pageant.

Career
She has acted in ‘There will be tomorrow’, a short English film directed by Bhushan Gaur (from New York Film Academy), acting opposite Sahil Salathia (Male lead for Everest TV show). The film was awarded at the HIV World Congress 2016 in Goa.

Mehta made her Hindi film debut as Pooja in the 2016 comedy feature film Days of Tafree, a remake of Gujarati hit film Chhello Divas. The actress has also starred in two series of the web science fiction thriller series A.I.SHA My Virtual Girlfriend.

References

External links
 
 
 

Actresses from Ahmedabad
1990 births
Living people
Actresses in Hindi cinema
Indian emigrants to the United Kingdom
English actresses
Actresses from London
English female models
English female dancers
Naturalised citizens of the United Kingdom
English people of Gujarati descent